David Roy Kryskow (born December 25, 1951) is a Canadian former ice hockey player.

Originally drafted by the Chicago Black Hawks in the 1971 NHL Amateur Draft, Kryskow played in Chicago for parts of two seasons.  Left exposed for the 1974 NHL Expansion Draft, he was claimed by the Washington Capitals.  After playing only 51 games for the Capitals, he was traded to the Detroit Red Wings. He would also play for the Atlanta Flames.

Kryskow finished his professional hockey career in the World Hockey Association playing for the Calgary Cowboys and Winnipeg Jets.

Career statistics

Regular season and playoffs

External links

Profile at hockeydraftcentral.com

1951 births
Living people
Atlanta Flames players
Calgary Cowboys players
Canadian ice hockey forwards
Chicago Blackhawks draft picks
Chicago Blackhawks players
Dallas Black Hawks players
Detroit Red Wings players
Edmonton Oil Kings (WCHL) players
Saskatoon Blades players
Ice hockey people from Edmonton
Tidewater Sharks players
Washington Capitals players
Winnipeg Jets (WHA) players